Chattooga County Courthouse, on Courthouse Sq. in Summerville, Georgia, was built in 1909.  It was listed on the National Register of Historic Places in 1980.

The courthouse has three pedimented Corinthian tetrastyle entrances;  the fourth entrance, also pedimented, has just four Corinthian pilasters.  It has a domed clock tower.

References

External links

County courthouses in Georgia (U.S. state)
National Register of Historic Places in Chattooga County, Georgia
Neoclassical architecture in Georgia (U.S. state)
Government buildings completed in 1909
1909 establishments in Georgia (U.S. state)